Cenchrus longispinus is a species of grass, also known as spiny burr grass or gentle Annie. Its fruits are clumped into  "burrs" with sharp, barbed spines that can penetrate the hides and mouth of grazing animals. They can also become lodged in human clothing, causing some discomfort. This activity is important for the plant's seed dispersal, as the plant is a summer annual.  The species has a prostrate habit when there is no competition for light.

The species is native to North America (Canada, Mexico, and the United States). It is a noxious weed in Europe, Australia and New Zealand where it was introduced.

References

longispinus
Grasses of North America
Grasses of Canada
Grasses of Mexico
Grasses of the United States
Grasses of Alabama